Lepidocollema is a genus of lichens in the family Pannariaceae. It was circumscribed in 1890 to contain a single Brazilian species that has not been collected since. In 2016, the entire family was revised and updated, resulting in the expansion of Lepidocollema to 24 tropical species.

Taxonomay
Lepidocollema was originally circumscribed in 1890 by Finnish lichenologist Edvard August Vainio with only the type species, L. carassense. This lichen is a gelatinous Parmeliella-like species that has a photobiont from the genus Nostoc. It has only been collected once from Brazil. The family Pannariaceae was revised in 2014 with the help of molecular phylogenetics. As a result, the genus was accepted and 23 tropical species were transferred into it, mostly from the genus Parmeliella. Phylogenetically, Lepidocollema is sister to Physma.

Description
Lepidocollema is characterised by the formation of large, flat rosettes on a thick layer of rhizohyphae, the presence of a cellular thalline cortex, apothecia with a thalline margin, asci with a wide apical ring-structure, and thin-walled ascospores. Other than the type species, the thallus is heteromerous in all Lepidocollema species. This refers to a tissue arrangement whereby the mycobiont (hyphae)  and photobionts (algal cells) are arranged in distinct layers.

Species
Lepidocollema adpressum 
Lepidocollema allochroum 
Lepidocollema borbonicum 
Lepidocollema brisbanense 
Lepidocollema carassense 
Lepidocollema cineratum 
Lepidocollema endoluteum 
Lepidocollema endomiltum 
Lepidocollema exornatum 
Lepidocollema fuscatum 
Lepidocollema granuliferum 
Lepidocollema imbricatulum 
Lepidocollema leiostroma 
Lepidocollema macrosporum 
Lepidocollema marianum 
Lepidocollema montanum 
Lepidocollema nitidum 
Lepidocollema pannarioides 
Lepidocollema papillatum 
Lepidocollema polyphyllinum 
Lepidocollema stylophorum 
Lepidocollema wainioi 
Lepidocollema zeylanicum

References

Peltigerales
Lichen genera
Taxa named by Edvard August Vainio
Taxa described in 1890
Peltigerales genera